The 2011 Point Optical Curling Classic was held from September 23 to 26 at the Nutana Curling Club in Saskatoon, Saskatchewan as part of the 2011–12 World Curling Tour. The purse for the event was CAD$60,000, and the winner, Mike McEwen, received CAD$15,000. McEwen defeated Alberta's Kevin Martin in a tight final, winning 6–5 in the extra end.

Teams

Knockout results

A event

B event

C event

Playoffs

External links
Event Home Page

Point Optical Curling Classic
2011 in Canadian curling
2011 in Saskatchewan
September 2011 sports events in Canada